The 2023 Mississippi State Bulldogs football team will represent Mississippi State University in the West Division of the Southeastern Conference (SEC) during the 2023 NCAA Division I FBS football season. The Bulldogs will be led by Zach Arnett in his first season as their head coach. Arnett was hired in December 2022 following the death of Mike Leach.

The Mississippi State football team plays its home games at Davis Wade Stadium in Starkville, Mississippi.

Schedule
Mississippi State and the SEC announced the 2023 football schedule on September 20, 2022. The 2023 Bulldogs' schedule consists of 8 home games and 4 away games for the regular season. Mississippi State will host four SEC conference opponents Alabama (rivalry), Kentucky, LSU (rivalry) and Ole Miss (Egg Bowl) at home and will travel to four SEC opponents, Arkansas, Auburn, South Carolina and Texas A&M to close out the SEC regular season on the road. Mississippi State is not scheduled to play SEC East opponents Florida, Georgia, Missouri, Tennessee and Vanderbilt in the 2023 regular season. The Bulldog's bye week comes during week 7 (on October 14, 2023).

Mississippi State out of conference opponents represent the MAC, Pac-12, SLC and the Sun Belt conferences. The Bulldogs will host all four non–conference games which are against Arizona from the Pac-12, Southeastern Louisiana from the SLC (FCS), Southern Miss from the Sunbelt and Western Michigan from the MAC.

References

Mississippi State
Mississippi State Bulldogs football seasons
Mississippi State Bulldogs football